Indramayu Sundanese or Indramayu Sundanese dialect or Indramayu dialector also Parean–Lelea dialect is a term for a variety of conversation Sundanese language, which is locally known as the basa Sunda Léléa  in Lelea and the basa Sunda Paréan  in Kandanghaur in the Indramayu Regency. By phonological, the dialects spoken in these areas are included in the non-h Sundanese dialect type so that, in his vocabulary, the consonant sound /h/ is not realized in all positions besides the consonant /h/. Unlike the Sundanese dialect, this dialect does not have the vowel sound /eu/. This dialect is also considered a phase of the old Sundanese language because its vocabulary is somewhat archaic or still retains the lexical forms of its predecessor language, namely the Old Sundanese language.

Origins 
According to a hypothesis, indigenous Indramayu originates from Mount Ceremai valley, which extends to the Tasikmalaya Regency. If this hypothesis or conjecture is proven true, it can be established that the original indigenous Indramayu are Sundanese people who speak Sundanese and have occupied the area for centuries.

In the Wangsakerta Manuscript, it is stated that in the area now part of Indramayu Regency, there once stood a kingdom called the Manukrawa Kingdom. in the 5th century, which is located in the downstream vicinity of the Cimanuk river. In the 9th century, the Indramayu region became the territory of the Kingdom of Sumedang Larang. In the 12th century, Sumedang Larang became the vasal Kingdom of Pajajaran, so Indramayu became part of the territory of the Kingdom of Pajajaran. At the beginning of its establishment, the territory of the Sumedang Larang Kingdom itself included Sumedang (core area), Karawang, Ciasem, Pamanukan, Indramayu, Sukapura, Bandung, and Parakanmuncang, although in the end some of these areas escaped the influence of Sumedang Larang. With the control of the northern Indramayu region such as Kandanghaur, Lelea, and Haurgeulis by the Sumedang Larang kingdom, making the culture in the area still survive in the Sundanese culture which is inherent until now, including the language spoken.

Based on the origins of the people of Indramayu, the language in Indramayu was originally Sundanese. The Sundanese language used in Indramayu forms the Sundanese dialect of Indramayu or what is often known as Sunda Parean or Sunda Lea.

Location of distribution 
Sundanese in Indramayu Regency is generally spoken in the Lelea district, precisely in the Lelea sub-district and Tamansari sub-district and in the Parean Girang sub-district, Ilir sub-district, and Bulak sub-district in Kandanghaur district. Apart from being mentioned in the above areas, Sundanese in Indramayu Regency is also spoken in the Cikawung sub-district area in Terisi district, several sub-district in Gantar district and Haurgeulis district, and in Mangunjaya sub-district. However, the Sundanese dialect spoken in the region is more or less the same as the Priangan Sundanese which is classified as a Modern Sundanese language phase.

Classification and kinship 
In the Sundanese language, the Indramayu dialect of Sundanese is classified as part of Cirebon Sundanese or the North-Eastern Sundanese dialect. However, the vocabulary is quite divergent compared to its closest relatives, such as the Majalengka Sundanese language (Middle-Eastern dialect). The use of this dialect covers the area of the former Cirebon Residency, namely Cirebon Regency, Cirebon City, Indramayu Regency, and Majalengka Regency, which is often acronymized as Ciayumajakuning.

The area where the Indramayu dialect is used is the enclave of the Cirebon Sundanese language because the location of its distribution is quite far from other areas of use of the Cirebon Sundanese language. Several types of words in the Indramayu dialect show similarities to Sundanese in the Banten area.

Usages 

In the Lelea sub-district, this dialect, locally referred to as Sunda-Léa, is used in various activities, especially in every adat ceremony,for example, in the traditional event Ngarot in Lelea village, which is a formal ceremony to welcome planting season in the area of agrarian. The activity is a process procession of young men and women decorated with various kinds of clothes to the village hall. The whole series of events starting from the welcoming, reading the history of the tradition, to the main event, always uses the Sunda-Léa language. An example of the use of Sunda-Léa is in the delivery section Pituah Kokolot Léléa (Older Lelea's Advice) which was conveyed by the village head of Lelea, as follows:

Free translations of the above text in Standard Sundanese and English are:

Besides being used in formal activities, Sunda-Léa language is also used in non-formal activities such as recitation, Friday sermon, kenduri, and so on. Even in educational activities, Sunda-Léa is used as a language of instruction lesson.

Most users of the Sundanese dialect of Indramayu in the Kandanghaur sub-district work as fishermen because of the geographical location of their residence, which is close to the sea, thus making some of the Sundanese people there choose to become fishermen as their livelihood. In addition, because the profession allows them to meet other people of different languages, on average they can master 2–3 languages.

Phonologies 
In terms of phonologies, the Indramayu dialect has quite a striking difference compared to the standard Sundanese language. As mentioned earlier, in standard Sundanese, there are 18 phonemes consonants and seven phonemes vowels. So in this dialect, there are 17 consonant phonemes and only six vowel phonemes, so the total number of phonemes is 23.

The phoneme symbol in the examples in this phonology section uses the Sundanese Spelling, the letter é (e in quotation marks above) symbolizes e (ɛ or [e]) as in the word "red" or "yes".

Vowels 
The 6 vowels phonemes in the Indramayu dialect can be seen in the table below.

The phoneme /eu/, common in standard Sundanese and other dialects, is not used in this dialect. Vocabulary with the phoneme /eu/ in standard Sundanese will be replaced with the phoneme /e/ or /u/. For example, in the word enggeus, 'already' becomes engges, and beuteung 'this' becomes butung. The suffix -keun in standard Sundanese also changes to -ken or -kun in this dialect.

The pattern of word development in the Indramayu dialect is of the o-u phonotactic type, which is different from the standard Sundanese language, which has the i-u phonotactic. Thus, some vocabulary in standard Sundanese such as ditu 'there', incu 'grandchild', tilu 'three', lintuh' fat', mintul 'blunt', dan diuk 'sit' will change to dotu 'there', oncu grandchild', tolu 'three', lontuh 'fat', montul 'blunt', dan douk 'sit' in the Indramayu dialect.

 Vowel phonemes 
The following table shows the vowel phonemes in the initial, middle, and final positions.

 Consonants 
There are 17 consonant phonemes in the Indramayu dialect which can be described in the table below.

The loss of the phoneme h in the Indramayu dialect is an internal innovation in the Kandanghaur and Lelea areas. The absence of the phoneme /h/ in the Indramayu dialect causes this dialect not to realize the phoneme /h/ in all positions (initial, medial, and final word). The sound [h] in standard Sundanese varies with the sound of [Ø] or [ʔ] in this dialect, for example, in initial positions like [untuʔ] 'teeth'; [ɛd͡ʒo] 'green'; [idɨŋ] 'black'; [ud͡ʒan] 'rain', and so on, in the medial position as in the form: [saʔa] 'who', [poʔo] 'forget', [kumaʔa] 'how', and so on, and in the final position as in the form [labuʔ] 'fall', [d͡ʒauʔ] 'far', [utaʔ] 'vomit'.

 Consonant phonemes 
The following table lists the vowel phonemes in the initial, middle, and final positions.

Apart from the differences above, several other differences in the sound system between the Indramayu dialect and standard Sundanese are listed below.

 The phoneme /a/ is sometimes realized as /o/, for example in the word éta 'it' becomes éto (allophone).
 There is a diphthong /ée/, as in /kapbéeh/, /empéeng/.
 Diphthongs in standard Sundanese /uy/ become vowels /i/, like /tuluy/ becomes /toli/.
 After the final vowel phoneme, a hamzah sound (marked by ') is heard, for example /ente'/
 Vocabulary in standard Sundanese which is inserted with vowel phonemes in the initial syllable turns into consonant clusters, e.g. /salapan/ becomes /slapan/, /ngalakon/ becomes /nglakon/, /paréan/ becomes /préan/, /carita/ becomes /crita/, /sabaraha/ becomes /sebraha/.
 The phoneme /a/ at the beginning of a syllable becomes /e/, for example, /sajalan/ becomes /sejalan/, /saperti/ becomes /seperti/, /cawéné/ becomes /cewéné/, /kunaon/ becomes /kenaon/, /sanaon/ becomes /senaon/ also /i/ becomes /e/, for example, /mimiti/ becomes /memiti/.
 There are /w/ and /r/ metatheses, for example, /riwayat/  becomes /wirayat/; /w/ and /h/, for example, /wahangan/ becomes /hawangan/.

 Morphology 
The Morphology of the Indramayu dialect is not much different from standard Sundanese, but in some cases, this dialect has its own peculiarities, especially in terms of affixation.

 Suffixation 
There are several suffixes which are only found in the Indramayu dialect, namely the suffix -é becomes asalé 'the origin', -né becomes artiné 'it means', side by side with the suffix -na like in standard Sundanese, then there is also the suffix -a as in the word ngaputa 'sewing'.

In addition, the suffix -un in the Indramayu dialect sometimes has a function grammatical which is similar to the suffix -keun in standard Sundanese, such as ngarosulun 'propose' in the Indramayu dialect, which is equivalent to ngarosulkeun in standard Sundanese.

 Simulfixation 
Simulfixation is the addition of prefixes and suffixes, namely affixes, which are added at the beginning and end of syllables. In the Indramayu dialect, the prefix pa- (functions as a characterizer for adverbs that are 'alone' so they can be treated as subjects) and ba- (functions as a signifier to the word it is attached to as an adverb, nature, condition, or motion) sometimes change to pe- and be-, like pegunungan (standard Sundanese: pagunungan) 'mountains' and betempuran (bahasa Sunda baku: batempuran) 'fight'.

Nasalization 
Nasalization in the Indramayu dialect is the same as the nasalization in standard Sundanese. In standard Sundanese, nasalization usually changes word class noun to a verb or forms an active sentence. In the Indramayu dialect, because there is a symptom of the omission of the phoneme /h/, there are essential words that are nasalized, as in the word héés 'sleep' in standard Sundanese, in nasalization, it becomes éés → ngéés 'sleep'.

 Examples 
Comparison of vocabulary typical of the Indramayu dialect with standard Sundanese.

 Text 
Research on the use of the Indramayu dialect has been carried out several times by researchers, such as the example that has been partially done by Abdurrachman, Oyon Sofyan Umsari, and Ruswandi Zarkasih which is presented in a book entitled Struktur Bahasa Sunda Dialek Cirebon published in 1985. In the book, there is transcription recording story in the form of conversation along with translation from an informant speaker of the Indramayu dialect located in Lelea district. Below, some excerpts from the transcription of the recording will be presented to illustrate the characteristics of the Indramayu dialect.Original textTranslation'''

 Lexicologies 
Another study on the Indramayu dialect was conducted in the Kandanghaur district (locally known as the Sunda-Paréan language) and presented data from various informants in the form of typical vocabulary and variations in their usage in the area.

Sundanese variations will be translated into several areas of meaning: body parts, Pronouns and greetings; kinship terms; house section; time, natural conditions and direction; clothing and jewellery; aroma and taste. Below will be described in full the variations in the use of the Sunda-Paréan language in the Kandanghaur district based on linguistic aspects, which include phonology, morphology, and lexical. 

 The term body part 

Based on the table above, some fields meaning limbs show variation in the Sunda-Paréan dialect. Five vocabulary words are used as examples: head, neck, body, hand, and foot. The glossary /head/ does not show phonological, morphological, or lexical aspects variations, while the glossary /neck/ shows the structures of language variations based on phonological elements. In the phonological aspect, /neck/ Glossary has several sound variants, which become/be'eng/, /beuheng/, /bieng/, and /bengeng/. If the glossary /leher/is seen from the lexical aspect, it has a vocabulary variant, namely /gulu/. Then, the glossary /body/ has a word variant, namely /badan/ and /awak/. Meanwhile, the glossary /hand/ shows that there are variations in language seen from the phonological aspect, namely: /lengen/ and /lengeun/, while the glossary /foot/ shows variations of the lexical, namely /suku/ and /sikil/.

 Pronouns and Greetings 

The glossary /me/has variations from the phonological and lexical aspects. In the phonological part, variations are found in the forms /kula/ and /kola/, while lexically, there are /aing/, /we/, and /aku/. Then, the glossary /kamu/ shows variations from the morphological aspect, namely the word /sampéan/. The term has the affix /-an/ from the root of the word /sampé/, while the lexical aspect is the word /inya/. Glossary /kita/ also has the form of language variations from the morphology aspect in the form of phrase reduplication /kami-kami'an/ while the lexical part has three types of words, namely /kami/, /kola/, and /kita/. The glossary /you/have the form of language variations from morphological and lexical aspects. Morphological aspects include reduplication /inya-inya'an/ and the affixation of the word /kabéan/ and /réa'an/, each of which has the suffix /-an/, while the glossary /they/have two language variations from the morphological aspect, which includes reduplication /batur-batur/ and affixation /sekabéan/ from the start /se-/ and ending /-an/. Then in the lexical field are the words /inya/ and /kabéh/.

 kinship terms 

In the glossary /grandfather/, there are variations of language based on morphological and lexical aspects. Morphological variations can be seen in the phrase, namely /bapa endé/ and /bapa gedé/, while in the lexical aspect, there is the word /mendé/ and /embah/. Then, the glossary of /grandmother/ shows the variation based on morphological and lexical aspects. The morphological aspect is the phrase /ma uyut/ and /ema gedé/, while the lexical aspect includes the word /mendé/ and /nini/. Then, the glossary /mother/ has variations from the phonological aspect, namely /emak/ and /ema/, while the lexical aspect contains the word /biang/. While the glossary /father/ has variations from the phonological aspect, namely /bapa/ and /bapak/. In contrast, the glossary /grandchildren/ has a variety of glossaries from phonological elements, such as /oncu/ and /incu/.

Other terms about family in the Indramayu dialect include:

The term panotog to express wife or panotog aing to express my wife is a form of euphemism (language refinement) which replaces the term éwé because it is now considered taboo by some speakers of other Sundanese dialects because it is considered connotation negative. However, the word éwé'' itself has long appeared in Old Sundanese.

House parts 

In the glossary /house/, there are variations from the phonological aspect, that is, /ima/ and /imah/, which gets the sound /h/ at the end of the word /ima/. Then, there is a glossary /genting/, which shows the various aspects of phonology, yaitu /gendéng/ and /genténg/differences between the letters /d/ and /t/. The glossary /wall/has variations from the lexical aspect, namely /wall/ and /wall/, while the glossary /door/ does not have language variations. While the glossary /floor/ has variations from the lexical aspect, namely /tekél/, /buruan/, and /floor/.

Time, Nature and Direction 

In the glossary /yesterday/, there are variations from the phonological and morphological aspects. The phonological aspect that appears is the word /kermari/ and /kemari/, while in the morphological aspect, there are variations in the form of /ker bréto/. Then, glossary /now/ has variations in phonological and lexical aspects. In the glossary /now/, there are variants of the word form /ayeuna/ and /ayena/ in the phonological aspect, while in the lexical aspect, there are words /sakiyén/. Then, glossary /cloudy/ has various variations in phonological and lexical aspects. Variations in the phonological aspect of the glossary /cloudy/ can be seen from the word /ceudem/ and /cedem/, while based on the lexical, there is the word /mendung/. Meanwhile, the glossary /kiri/ only has lexical variations, namely /kenca/, /kiri/, and /ngiwé/. While the glossary /right/ has two variations based on phonological and lexical aspects. The phonological aspect of the glossary /right/ is the word /nganan/ and /kanan/, while the lexical aspect is the word /tengen/ and /ketu’u/.

Clothing and jewelry 

In the glossary /baju/, there are two forms of language variation from the lexical aspect, namely /baju/ and /pakéan/. Then, the glossary /pants/ has language variations from phonological and lexical aspects. In the phonological aspect, there are words /soal/ and /sowal/, while the lexical aspect is in the word /celana/. In the glossary /bracelet/, there is only language variations from the lexical part, namely /gelang/ and /pinggel/. While the glossary /ring/ has a variety of phonological aspects in the form of reduplication, namely /ali-ali/, and the lexical aspect is /ali/ dan /ngerining/. The last glossary, /anting/, has language variations from the lexical aspect, namely /anting/ and /cubang/.

Taste and smell 

The glossary /fragrance/has variations from the phonological aspect /sengit/ and /seungit/, while the lexical variation is the word /wangi/. In the glossary /rot/, language variations are from the lexical aspect, namely /berek/, /bari/, and /bau/. Then, in the glossary /sweet/, there is no form of language variation whatsoever. Meanwhile, in the glossary /bitter/, there are language variations from phonological and lexical aspects. In the phonological aspect, there is the word /pait/ and /pa'it/, which is distinguished by quotation marks, while in the lexical aspect, there is the word /letir/. Then, just like the glossary /sweet/, the glossary /salty/has no variation.

Numerals 
Below is a table containing cardinal numbers and ordinal numbers in the Indramayu dialect and their equivalents in standard Sundanese and Indonesian.

Information

References

footnotes

List of references

Further reading

External links 

Sundanese language